Megachile cypricola is a species of bee in the family Megachilidae. It was described by Mavromoustakis in 1938. This species has not been observed since 1950, and may be extinct.

References

Cypricola
Insects described in 1938